Aparna Brielle (born Aparna Parthasarathy on February 5, 1994) is an American actress. She portrayed Sarika Sarkar on the NBC television series A.P. Bio.

Early life
Aparna Brielle was born in Clackamas, Oregon to Indian American couple Partha Rajagopal and Girija Parthasarathy, and was raised in the Cedar Mill area of the Portland, Oregon, metropolitan area. She has one younger brother, Vijay. As a child, she attended Valley Catholic School (then known as St. Mary of the Valley) in Beaverton, Oregon. At the age of nine, Brielle was amongst the youngest Bharatanatyam dancers in the world to graduate in an Arangetram performance after a mere three years of training. She attended the Arts & Communications High School, appearing in performances such as their fall 2011 production of Godspell, still performing as Aparna Parthasarathy. Brielle then attended Linfield College, where she majored in marketing.

Career
In 2014, Brielle made her television debut on NBC's supernatural drama Grimm. In 2015, she appeared in TNT's The Librarians and in 2016, she appeared in Fox's short-lived Cooper Barrett's Guide to Surviving Life.

In 2017, Brielle was cast as Sarika, "a career-driven student who's constantly trying to do everything right and climb the ladder" in the NBC comedy A.P. Bio, which premiered in 2018.

Brielle also stars as Lorna Reddy in Dead Girls Detective Agency, one of several new digital shows produced by NBCUniversal and Snap Inc. as part of their Snap Originals series. The first season began airing October 22, 2018, with a new episode available for viewing every day. Dead Girls Detective Agency was renewed for a third and fourth season and began airing new episodes on August 11, 2019.

In early 2019, Brielle joined Kevin Smith's View Askewniverse, playing Jihad in Jay and Silent Bob Reboot, which was released on October 15 of that same year. According to Smith, the "plucky Jihad" is part of a girl gang not unlike the characters played by Shannon Elizabeth, Ali Larter, Jennifer Schwalbach, and Eliza Dushku; however, the girls are not international jewel thieves, and their specific grouping was set up as a commentary on youth and diversity being a common focal-point in Hollywood's reboots and remakes.

On May 12, 2020, it was revealed that Brielle had landed the starring role of the sequel to Mallrats as Banner Bruce, daughter of Brodie Bruce (Jason Lee) and Rene Mosier (Shannen Doherty). This marks her second collaboration with Kevin Smith, who said, "I was so impressed with Aparna Brielle, I built [Twilight of the Mallrats] around her."

In August 2021, Brielle joined the cast of Netflix's Boo, Bitch in the role of Riley, who is described as "a mean girl who disguises her meanness through calculated manipulation. Riley has made Erika’s life miserable ever since their freshman year." The mini-series is set to air on July 8, 2022.

Netflix announced that Brielle would join the cast of their Arnold Schwarzenegger Spy Adventure Series in April 2022. Brielle will be playing Tina, "an NSA analyst on loan to the CIA. Despite her youth, she is very good at her job – extremely capable and intelligent, though a bit intimidated by her new colleagues."

Filmography

Television

Film

Web

References

External links
 
 
 

Living people
1994 births
Actresses from Portland, Oregon
People from Clackamas, Oregon
Linfield University alumni
American actresses of Indian descent
21st-century American actresses
Bharatanatyam exponents